The 2013–14 Alcorn State Braves basketball team represented Alcorn State University during the 2013–14 NCAA Division I men's basketball season. The Braves, led by head coach Luther Riley, played their home games at the Davey Whitney Complex and were members of the Southwestern Athletic Conference. They finished the season 12–19, 9–9 in SWAC play to finish in sixth place. They lost in the quarterfinals of the SWAC tournament to Alabama State.

Roster

Schedule

|-
!colspan=9 style="background:#A020F0; color:#FFD700;"| Regular season

|-
!colspan=9 style="background:#A020F0; color:#FFD700;"| SWAC tournament

References

Alcorn State Braves basketball seasons
Alcorn State